The Cuicatecs are an indigenous people of Mexico. The Cuicatecs traditionally speak the Cuicatec language and are closely related to the Mixtecs. Alongside the Trique and Mixtecan, the Cuicatecs form one branch of the Otomanguean language family. 

They inhabit two towns in the state of Oaxaca: Teutila and Tepeuxila. According to the 2012 census, they number around 12,785, of whom an estimated 65% are speakers of the language. The name Cuicatec is a Nahuatl exonym, from  'song'  'inhabitant of place of'.

References

External links
 Cuicatec people on ILV México.

Indigenous peoples in Mexico